Travis Feeney (born November 18, 1992) is an American football linebacker for the St. Louis BattleHawks of the XFL. He was drafted by the Pittsburgh Steelers in the sixth round of the 2016 NFL Draft. He played college football for University of Washington. He has previously played for the Toronto Argonauts of the Canadian Football League (CFL).

Professional career

Pittsburgh Steelers
Feeney was drafted by the Steelers in the sixth round, 220th overall, in the 2016 NFL Draft. On September 3, 2016, he was released by the Steelers as part of final roster cuts and was signed to their practice squad the next day.

New Orleans Saints
On December 9, 2016, the New Orleans Saints signed Feeney off the Steelers' practice squad.

On June 6, 2017, Feeney was waived by the Saints.

San Diego Fleet
On October 14, 2018, Feeney signed with the San Diego Fleet.

Montreal Alouettes
After the AAF ceased operations in April 2019, Feeney signed with the Montreal Alouettes of the Canadian Football League on May 29, 2019, but was released the same day.

Toronto Argonauts
Feeney signed with the Toronto Argonauts on March 31, 2020. After the CFL canceled the 2020 season due to the COVID-19 pandemic, Feeney chose to opt-out of his contract with the Argonauts on August 31, 2020. Feeney was selected by the Jousters of The Spring League during its player selection draft on October 11, 2020. He opted back in to his contract with the Argonauts on February 3, 2021. Feeney was released during the off-season after dressing for just 6 games for Toronto.

St. Louis BattleHawks
The St. Louis BattleHawks selected Feeney in the second round of the 2023 XFL Supplemental Draft on January 1, 2023.

References

External links
 Washington Huskies bio
 New Orleans Saints bio

1992 births
Living people
American football linebackers
Montreal Alouettes players
New Orleans Saints players
Pittsburgh Steelers players
San Diego Fleet players
Sportspeople from Richmond, California
The Spring League players
Toronto Argonauts players
Washington Huskies football players
Tampa Bay Bandits (2022) players
St. Louis BattleHawks players